The Besson MB.411 was a French two-seat spotter and observation floatplane, designed by Besson.

Development
In 1932, Besson created the MB.410 by replacing the twin floats of the MB.35 with a single main float and two outrigger floats just inboard of the wingtips. The engine was cowled and fuselage streamlining was improved. The prototype was destroyed in a fatal accident during testing.

The French Navy required a spotter aircraft for its new submarine Surcouf, and ordered a production version, designated MB.411. It was specifically designed for housing in a cylindrical hangar in the back of Surcouf'''s conning tower. The Besson MB.411 could be assembled to put on the wings in about 4 minutes (at open sea up to 20  minutes) after it was removed from its hangar, then lowered to the water and retrieved by a crane. MB.411 was a low-wing monoplane with a large single central float and under the wing two small stabilizing floats.  The Besson MB.411 was constructed with a mix of wood and metal, with canvas covering. In autumn of 1934, the MB.411 was sent to Brest for boarding trials on the Surcouf. The aircraft made its first flight at Le Mureau in June 1935.  Surcouf then took the Besson MB.411 to the Caribbean arriving in September 1935 for sea trials. In January 1936  MB.411 returned to Mureaux for changes. The second MB.411 was completed in February 1937. The second MB.411 made its first flight December 1937 and was delivered July 1938. The second MB.411 replaced the first in the Surcouf.

Operational history
The Surcouf chose on June 18, 1940, to join the Free French Naval Forces in England. The Surcouf'' was assigned to the protection of convoys in the Atlantic near Bermuda, but the MB.411 stayed in England. It made a few flights on the coast of Devon and was damaged in Plymouth in April 1941 during a Luftwaffe bombing raid. Apparently, it was later repaired, changing its appearance, and used by 765 Naval Air Squadron (765 NAS) from RNAS Sandbanks. Later scrapped at RAF Mount Batten after being rendered unserviceable due to lack of spares (https://www.key.aero/forum/historic-aviation/146018-digging-up-an-old-query-mystery-floatplane-that-might-be-a-besson-mb411). The first MB.411 remained in France and was assigned to Fleet Squadron Aeronavale Escadrille 7-S-4 in St Mandrier and was scrapped by the Nazis in France.

Variants
MB.41 – original prototype powered by a single  Salmson 9Nc.
MB-411 – production version intended for operation from submarines but eventually only operated from large warships.

Operators

French Navy

Specifications (MB.411)

See also

References

Bibliography

The Putnam Aeronautical Review, edited by John Motum Page 50 and 51.

1920s French military reconnaissance aircraft
Submarine-borne aircraft
Besson aircraft
Aircraft first flown in 1935
Low-wing aircraft
Single-engined tractor aircraft
Floatplanes